The following is a list of stars with resolved images, that is, stars whose images have been resolved beyond a point source. Aside from the Sun, observed from Earth, stars are exceedingly small in apparent size, requiring the use of special high-resolution equipment and techniques to image. For example, Betelgeuse, the first star other than the Sun to be directly imaged, has an angular diameter of only 50 milliarcseconds (mas).

List

See also
Doppler imaging which produces maps of the surfaces of stars
Zeeman–Doppler imaging which maps the magnetic fields of stars
List of directly imaged exoplanets
Angular resolution
Angular diameter
List of nearest stars and brown dwarfs

References

Images
Astronomy image articles